Lialis is a genus of legless lizards in the family Pygopodidae. The genus is native to Australia and New Guinea.

Diet
Lizards in the genus Lialis specialize in eating skinks. They have hinged teeth and kinetic skull joints which flex allowing them to swallow their prey whole.

Reproduction
Lizards in the genus Lialis exhibit oviparity.

Species
The following two species are recognized as being valid.

Lialis burtonis 
Lialis jicari

References

Further reading
Boulenger GA (1885). Catalogue of the Lizards in the British Museum (Natural History). Second Edition. Volume I. ... Pygopodidæ .... London: Trustees of the British Museum (Natural History). (Taylor and Francis, printers). xii + 436 pp. + Plates I-XXXII. (Genus Lialis, p. 246).
Gray JE (1835). "Characters of a New Genus of Reptiles (Lialis) from New South Wales". Proceedings of the Zoological Society of London 1834: 134–135. (Lialis, new genus, p. 134). (in Latin and English).

 
Pygopodidae
Lizard genera
Taxa named by John Edward Gray